Ctrl Alt Delete is the first studio album by American record producer Free the Robots. It was released on Alpha Pup Records on March 30, 2010. "The Eye" features a guest appearance from Ikey Owens. A music video was created for "Jupiter".

Critical reception
Wayne Stronell of Cyclic Defrost said, "Ctrl Alt Delete is a blistering record of intense synthesizer wizardry, but along the way it has absorbed so much more than just another electronic album, the influences are varied, and the result would please many a fan in varying genres, from dubstep, grime, hip hop and wonky abstract beat science."

Ctrl Alt Delete was listed by Chris Ziegler of OC Weekly as "One of the Strongest Local Releases of the Year".

Track listing

References

External links
 
 

2010 debut albums
Alpha Pup Records albums
Instrumental hip hop albums
Hip hop albums by American artists
Electronic albums by American artists